Gymnoclytia hirticollis is  a North American species of tachinid flies in the genus Gymnoclytia of the family Tachinidae .

References

Phasiinae
Diptera of North America
Insects described in 1892
Taxa named by Frederik Maurits van der Wulp